Indian New Zealanders are persons of Indian origin or descent, living in New Zealand. The term includes Indians born in New Zealand, as well as immigrants from India, Fiji, as well as other regions of Asia, parts of Africa such as South Africa as well as East Africa, and furthermore, from other parts of the world. The term Indian New Zealander applies to any New Zealanders with one or both parents of Indian heritage. Although sometimes the Indo-Kiwi definition has been expanded to people with mixed racial parentage with one Indian parent or grandparent, this can be controversial as it generally tends to remove the ethnic heritage or identity of the foreign parent or grandparent which may be termed as insensitive to those with mixed parentage, who tend to value both their Indian and non-Indian parents and grandparents.

Indian New Zealanders are the fastest growing Kiwi ethnic group, and the second largest group of New Zealand Asians after Chinese. The largest number of Indians living in New Zealand are from Fiji. The fifth largest language in New Zealand is Hindi, shown in the 2018 census. According to ENZ.org (a New Zealand Government affiliate), since 2011, 18,000 Indians have migrated to New Zealand. In 2011, the Indian population in New Zealand was 155,000, so there are 174,000 Indians in New Zealand (2014) due to the additional immigration of 18,000. Most early New Zealand Indians were of Punjabi or Gujarati descent.

History
Indians began to arrive in New Zealand in the late eighteenth century, mostly as crews on British ships. The earliest known Indians to set foot in New Zealand were Muslim lascars who arrived in Dec 1769 on the ship Saint Jean Baptiste captained by Frenchman Jean François Marie de Surville sailing from Pondicherry, India. Their arrival marks the beginning of Indian presence in New Zealand, in which hundreds of unnamed South Asian lascars visited New Zealand on European ships in order to procure timber and seal skins.

The period of Indian settlement begins with the earliest known Indian resident of New Zealand, a lascar of Bengali descent from the visiting ship City of Edinburgh who jumped ship in 1809 in the Bay of Islands to live with a Māori wife. Another took up residence on Stewart Island around the same time.

Possibly the earliest non-Māori settlers of the Otago region of South Island were three Indian lascars who deserted ship to live among the Maori in 1813. There, they assisted the Ngāi Tahu by passing on new skills and technologies, including how to attack colonial European vessels in the rain when their guns could not be fired. They integrated into Māori culture completely, participating in Tā moko and taking on Māori names.

The late 1800s and early 1900s saw the first wave of migration of Indians arriving in the country. A number of them came directly to New Zealand but some came via Fiji and others via other British colonies such as Burma. A large number of these early migrants were Indian teenagers, mainly from Punjab and Gujarat. They were generally looked after by the Māori community, and tended to have unions with Māori women.

Official policy in New Zealand to restrict non-European immigration resulted in difficulties for Indians to enter the country in the 1920s. Groups like The White New Zealand League, established in 1926, was opposed to both Chinese and Indian immigration because it was seen as a threat to the economic prosperity of European New Zealanders. Racial tensions between local Indians and Pākehā/Europeans lasted for decades in Pukekohe. Until the late 1950s, Indians there were excluded from barbershops, hair salons, bars, and balcony seats in cinemas, and could not join the local growers' association. At this time, a large number of Punjabi Sikhs, who often had farming experience, settled in the Waikato district and took up dairy farming.

Before the 1970s it remained difficult for Indians not related to the earlier immigrants to enter New Zealand. However, a small number of Fijian Indians and Indian-descent refugees from Uganda arrived in the country. By the 1980s, the official attitude towards Asian immigration relaxed and an increased number of Indians arrived in New Zealand.

Socioeconomics

Demographics

According to the 2018 New Zealand census, there were 239,193 ethnic Indians in New Zealand making up 4.7% of New Zealand's population. This is an increase of 84,015 people (54.1%) since the 2013 census, and an increase of 134,610 people (128.7%) since the 2006 census. Some of the increase between the 2013 and 2018 census was due to Statistics New Zealand adding ethnicity data from other sources (previous censuses, administrative data, and imputation) to the 2018 census data to reduce the number of non-responses.

There were 129,123 males and 110,070 females, giving a sex ratio of 1.173 males per female. The median age was 30.0 years, compared with 37.4 years for all New Zealanders; 47,505 people (19.8%) were aged under 15 years, 71,796 (30.0%) were 15 to 29, 106,665 (44.6%) were 30 to 64, and 13,230 (5.5%) were 65 or older.

In terms of population distribution, 64.7% of Indian New Zealanders lived in the Auckland region, 26.3% lived in the North Island outside the Auckland region, and 9.0% lived in the South Island. The Ōtara-Papatoetoe local board area of Auckland had the highest concentration of Indian people at 26.2%, with Papatoetoe in Auckland considered to be New Zealand's little India. The next highest concentrations are in the Puketāpapa local board area (22.9%) and the Whau local board area (18.2%). Hamilton City has the highest concentration of Indian peoples outside of Auckland at 7.3%. The Chatham Islands and Great Barrier Island had the lowest concentrations, recording no Indian people in their respective areas.

The proportion of Indian New Zealanders born overseas was 76.2%, compared with 27.1% for all ethnicities. Nearly two-thirds (65.7%) of those born in New Zealand were aged under 15.

At the 2013 census, 72.0 percent of Indian New Zealanders aged 15 and over were in the labour force, of which 8.3 percent were unemployed. The large employment industries of Indians were retail trade (16.3 percent), health care and social assistance (11.7 percent), and accommodation and food services (9.7 percent).

Religion

According to the 2018 New Zealand census, 46.6% of Indian New Zealanders identified as Hindus, 21.4% as Sikhs, 15.1% as Christians, 8.7% as Muslims, while 8.1% identified themselves as having no religion.

Hindutva activism and intracommunal tensions
During the 2020s, Hindutva activism within the New Zealand Indian diaspora attracted attention from the media and law enforcement authorities. In February 2020, The Spinoff guest writer Shahid S. claimed that Islamophobia was present among Indian diaspora social media pages, with the circulation of posts attacking Muslim immigration and praising the Xinjiang internment camps that targeted China's predominantly Muslim Uyghur minority. The Bharatiya Janata Party (BJP) government's passage of the Citizenship Amendment Act and the National Register of Citizens for Assam in 2019 also sparked anti-BJP protests in New Zealand which inflamed BJP supporters in New Zealand. 

In May 2021, the Massey University communication professor Dr Mohan Dutta published a two-page white paper called Cultural Hindutva and Islamophobia about alleged Islamophobic elements in Hindutva ideology, calling for a careful examining of its presence in New Zealand. Dutta likened the online communication of Hindutva supporters to that of QAnon followers and the far-right Proud Boys.  The white paper received a polarising response, with Dutta receiving online abuse and threats from Hindutva supporters. Two Indian community organisations the New Zealand Hindu Council, the affiliated Hindu Youth Association, and the Indian community website The Indian News accusing Dutta and Massey University of promoting Hinduphobia. By contrast, the Aotearoa Alliance of Progressive Indians (AAPI), NZ Indian Association of Minorities, and Hindus for Human Rights Australia and New Zealand defending Dutta's academic freedom, condemning threats against Dutta, and calling for the New Zealand and Australian governments to monitor Hindutva ideology within the Indian diaspora communities.

In mid-September 2021, Dutta also participated in a controversial international online academic conference called "Dismantling Hindutva," which was co-sponsored by Massey University and 70 other academic institutions. Dr Sapna Samant of the left-wing advocacy group Aotearoa Alliance of Progressive Indians (AAPI) also claimed that local Hindutva supporters were intimidating her and Dutta. In late September, the New Zealand Police confirmed that they were investigating online threats against Dutta and had put a safety plan in place.

Notable individuals

Business
Sir Owen Glenn, businessman and philanthropist

Entertainment
Aaradhna Patel, R&B artist
Shailesh Prajapati, New Zealand actor, best known for his role as Ernie in Power Rangers MegaForce
Shirley Setia, New Zealand singer and actress
Jacob Rajan, playwright and actor, whose most notable work is Krishnan's Dairy
Madeleine Sami, New Zealand actor of Irish and Fiji Indian heritage, best known for her role as Tania in Sione's Wedding

Media
Rohit Kumar Happy, editor of Bharat-Darshan, Hindi literary magazine
Rebecca Singh, news presenter on the New Zealand television station TV3

Politics
Gaurav Sharma (politician), Member of Parliament (2020-2022)
Priyanca Radhakrishnan, Member of Parliament since 2017 serving as the 10th Minister for the Community and Voluntary Sector, 15th Minister for Youth and Minister for Diversity, Inclusion and Ethnic Communities in the Sixth Labour Government
Kanwal Bakshi, Member of Parliament (2008-2020)
Parmjeet Parmar, Member of Parliament (2014-2020)
Mahesh Bindra, Member of Parliament (2014-2017)
Rajen Prasad, former Race Relations Commissioner and Families Commissioner, and Member of Parliament (2008-2014)
Anand Satyanand, former Governor-General of New Zealand, appointed on 23 August 2006
Ajit Swaran Singh, District Judge
Dame Sukhi Turner, Mayor of Dunedin (1995–2004)

Sport
Sarpreet Singh, football player currently playing as a midfielder for Bayern Munich II in Germany.
Rocky Khan, rugby union player
Dipak Narshibhai Patel, cricket player who has played 37 Tests and 75 one-day internationals for the New Zealand cricket team
Jeetan Patel, former spin bowler for the New Zealand cricket team
Ish Sodhi, current spin bowler for the New Zealand cricket team
Jeet Raval, current test batsman for the New Zealand cricket team
Ajaz Patel, current spin bowler for the New Zealand cricket team
Jakob Bhula, New Zealand domestic cricketer
Roneel Hira, New Zealand domestic cricketer
Tarun Nethula, New Zealand domestic cricketer

Media

TV 
APNA Television

Newspapers 

 The Indian news
 Indian Weekender
 Indianz x-press
 Indian Newslink
 Multicultural Times
 Kuk Hindi samachar

See also

 Māori Indians
 Punjabi New Zealanders
 Indian diaspora
 Indianisation
 Greater India
 India–New Zealand relations

References

External links
Te Ara, the encyclopedia of New Zealand
Indians in New Zealand
Indian population growth in New Zealand
New Zealand Indian Central Association
Indian Weekender Newspaper for Kiwi Indians
List of Indian groups, organizations and associations in New Zealand
The Indian Diaspora in New Zealand, a bibliography of known published Academic sources
NRI Online, news snippets and articles related to New Zealand NRIs
Bharat-Darshan (भारत-दर्शन): world's first Hindi publication on the net. Indian philosophy and Hindi literary magazine.

Asian New Zealander
 
 N